Sir John Coryton, 4th Baronet (c. 1690–1739) was a British landowner and politician who sat in the House of Commons between 1713 and 1734.

Coryton was born at Greenwich, the only son of Sir William Coryton, 3rd Baronet and his wife Susanna Littleton, daughter of Edward Littleton MP of Pillaton, Staffordshire. He was educated at Rugby School from 1698 and matriculated at Christ Church, Oxford on 14 October 1708, aged 18. He succeeded to the baronetcy on the death of his father on 6 December 1711. He married Rachel Helyar, daughter of William Helyar of East Coker, Somerset on 31 October 1715.

Coryton was returned as a Tory Member of Parliament for Callington in the general elections of 1713 and 1715. He did not stand in the  1722 general election, but was returned as MP for Callington again in 1727. He did not stand in 1734 as Walpole had bought him out of the seat.

Coryton died on  22 May 1739. He had no children and the baronetcy became extinct.

References

1690s births
1739 deaths
People educated at Rugby School
Alumni of Christ Church, Oxford
British MPs 1710–1713
British MPs 1713–1715
British MPs 1715–1722
British MPs 1727–1734
Members of the Parliament of Great Britain for English constituencies
Baronets in the Baronetage of England